Pan Gongsheng (born July 8, 1963) is a Chinese economist, banker, reformist and bureaucrat. As deputy governor of the People's Bank of China since December 2012, he works on the monetary policy of the People's Republic of China. Pan is also director of State Administration of Foreign Exchange.

Education
Pan received his Ph.D. in economics from the Renmin University of China. He did his post-doctoral research at the Cambridge University and was a research fellow at the Harvard University.

Career

Commercial Banking
Pan was Vice President of Agricultural Bank of China from 2008-2010. Prior to Agricultural Bank Pan worked at Industrial and Commercial Bank of China in a number of positions.

People's Bank of China
In 2012 Pan joined the People's Bank of China as Deputy Governor, and later assumed leadership of State Administration of Foreign Exchange, as its administrator. Pan leads Leading Group of Internet Financial Risks Remediation, which has been tasked with clamping down on Bitcoin and Cryptocurrency in China.

He is also a member of the Academic Committee of the China Finance 40 Forum (CF40).

References

External links 
 http://www.pbc.gov.cn/english/130715/130839/index.html

1963 births
People's Republic of China economists
Renmin University of China alumni
Living people
Agricultural Bank of China people
Industrial and Commercial Bank of China people
Economists from Anhui
Businesspeople from Anhui
People's Republic of China politicians from Anhui
Chinese Communist Party politicians from Anhui